Galegos Parish may refer to:

Galegos (Santa Maria), a parish in Barcelos Municipality, Portugal
Galegos (São Martinho), a parish in Barcelos Municipality, Portugal
Galegos (Penafiel), a parish in Penafiel Municipality, Portugal
Galegos (Póvoa de Lanhoso), a parish in the municipality of Póvoa de Lanhoso, Portugal

Parish name disambiguation pages